William Hughes Bowker Frank (23 November 1872 – 16 February 1945) was a South African cricketer who played in one Test in 1896.

References

1872 births
1945 deaths
South Africa Test cricketers
South African cricketers
Sportspeople from Qonce